Eliza Legzdina is an Latvian-British musician. She is known for her eclectic fusion of hip hop, electronic music, dance pop and R&B with lyrics focused on dismantling patriarchy, capitalism and white supremacy, as well as developing self-respect and self-love while also discussing her background as an immigrant. Her debut EP Iron Curtain Golden Pussy was released in 2020.

In 2022, Apple produced an advertisement for their tenth-generation iPad, using her song "YUM!"

References

Living people
Year of birth missing (living people)